Bathysauroides gigas, the pale deepsea lizardfish, is the only species in the family Bathysauroididae. This species is found in the western Pacific Ocean where it is so far only known from the waters around Japan and Australia.

References
 

Aulopiformes

Fish of the Pacific Ocean
Deep sea fish
Fish described in 1952